Parliamentary elections were held in Venezuela on 6 December 2015 to elect the 164 deputies and three indigenous representatives of the National Assembly. They were the fourth parliamentary elections to take place after the 1999 constitution, which abolished the bicameral system in favour of a unicameral parliament, and the first to take place after the death of President Hugo Chávez. Despite predictions from the opposition of a possible last-minute cancellation, the elections took place as scheduled, with the majority of polls showing the Democratic Unity Roundtable (MUD) holding a wide lead over the ruling United Socialist Party of Venezuela (PSUV) and its wider alliance, the Great Patriotic Pole (GPP).

The political landscape leading up to the elections was heavily influenced by the severe economic crisis faced by the country, as well as a series of protests that took place in 2014, after which former Chacao mayor and leader of Popular Will, Leopoldo López, was detained and sentenced to 14 years in prison. The scarcity of basic goods and high inflation were the central topics of discussion, with each party blaming their opponent as the cause. Introducing economic policies to counter the crisis, as well as granting amnesty to political prisoners, was the main campaign pledge of the MUD. The ruling PSUV, on the other hand, ran a campaign focused on overcoming what they called an "economic war" led by the right-wing against the Venezuelan people, as well as defending the legacy of Chávez and the social policies introduced during his presidency.

The result was a decisive defeat for the PSUV, which lost control of the Assembly for the first time since 1999. The MUD, composed of politicians opposed to the government of both Chávez and his successor, won 109 seats, and with the support of the three indigenous representatives, gained a supermajority of 112 seats against 55 won by the GPP. In terms of popular vote, the MUD received 7.7 million votes, an increase of 2.4 million from the 2010 elections, becoming the most voted party in Venezuelan electoral history. In comparison, the GPP only managed to gain an additional 200,000 votes, to total 5.6 million votes.

Background
Since the 1999 Constitutional Assembly elections, the National Assembly was dominated by alliances supportive of President Hugo Chávez. In the 2005 parliamentary elections, most opposition parties decided to withdraw, resulting in all seats being won by the Fifth Republic Movement and other parties supportive of Chávez. For the 2010 elections, an alliance of opposition parties was formed by the Democratic Unity Roundtable to contest the elections, and managed to win 64 seats. The PSUV, which was an alliance formed by Chávez from the Fifth Republic Movement and a number of smaller parties, won 96 seats, maintaining their majority, but lost their two-thirds and three-fifths supermajority. Fatherland for All, a small left-wing party, won two seats. After Chávez's death in 2013, his hand-picked successor Maduro was narrowly elected president, continuing Chávez' ideological influence. In 2015, the Democratic Unity Roundtable alliance aimed to improve its result from last time and end the incumbent PSUV government, while Maduro said he had faith in the voters giving the government a large majority.

Protests

In 2014, a series of protests and demonstrations began in Venezuela. The protests have been attributed to inflation, violence and shortages in Venezuela. The protests have been largely peaceful, though some have escalated and resulted in violence from both protesters and government forces. The government has accused the protests of being motivated by 'fascists' opposition leaders, capitalism and foreign influence, and has itself been accused of censorship, supporting groups called colectivos using violence against protesters and politically motivated arrests.

Electoral system
Starting from 2015, the 167 members of the National Assembly were elected by a mixed majoritarian system; 113 members were elected by First-past-the-post voting in 87 constituencies. A total of 51 seats were elected by closed list proportional representation based on the 23 states and the Capital District. Seats were allocated using the d'Hondt method. The remaining three seats were reserved for indigenous peoples, and were elected by the community.

The opposition coalition held primaries on 17 May in 33 of the 87 electoral districts, choosing candidates for 42 seats; 125 additional candidates were expected to be hand-picked by 'consensus' among party leaders, though the rules were later changed to require 40% of opposition candidates to be women and barred some popular opposition candidates from running, a move that experts called unconstitutional. The PSUV held primaries in all 87 electoral districts on 28 June with the Bolivarian government stating there was a participation of 3,162,400 voters, though some observing the primaries noticed a large decrease of voters to less than 1 million participating, or about 10% of PSUV members.

Opinion polls
Graphical summary

Poll results are listed in the tables below in chronological order and using the date the survey's fieldwork was done, as opposed to the date of publication. If such date is unknown, the date of publication is given instead. The highest percentage figure in each polling survey is displayed in bold, and the background shaded in the leading party's colour.

Conduct
Leading up to the elections, serious issues have been raised about its fairness and credibility. On 10 October 2015, Brazil pulled out of a UNASUR electoral mission to observe the Venezuelan election over what it said a lack of guarantees by the socialist government and its veto of the choice to head the delegation. In a statement on 10 November 2015, Secretary General of the Organization of American States Luis Almagro condemned Venezuela's electoral process, explaining that the ruling party, PSUV, has an unfair advantage with its ability to use public assets, media access, creating dubious voting sheets and by disqualifying opposition politicians, stating that "It's worrying that ... the difficulties only impact the opposition parties".

After the election, the opposition MUD coalition was accused of vote-buying in the state of Amazonas. The Supreme Court suspended all four Amazonas delegates (one socialist and three opposition). As of May 2018, these claims have not been proven.

Results

The MUD won 109 of the 164 general seats and all three indigenous seats, which gave them a supermajority in the National Assembly, while the GPP won the remaining 55 seats. Voter turnout was just over 74 percent.

The Great Patriotic Pole coalition led by the PSUV received 5,625,248 votes (40.92%) in the party-list vote. A total of 29 parties were members of the coalition, although six of them ran separately in some states.

List vote by state

Elected representatives

Reactions

Domestic
According to the Associated Press, celebrations and fireworks could be heard in the streets of Caracas following the MUD victory. In a speech following the results, President Maduro acknowledged his party's defeat, saying that, despite these "adverse results", Venezuela's democracy and constitution had triumphed; while calling for peace, re-evaluation, he attributed the opposition's victory to an intensification of the "economic war". A defiant Maduro said he would give no quarter to the Venezuelan opposition in spite of his own party's crushing defeat in last weekend's mid-term parliamentary elections. Maduro vowed to block "the counter-revolutionary right" from taking over the country. "We won't let it," he said. The leader of the MUD, Jesús Torrealba, told supporters after their party's victory that "The country wants change and that change is beginning today". Henrique Capriles Radonski, a leading opposition politician, stated "The results are as we hoped. Venezuela has won. It's irreversible".

International
Venezuelan bonds grew across the board about one to three cents after the announcement of MUD's victory in the elections, with one researcher at Exotix brokerage stating, "It's better than we expected. Polls suggested a victory but whether that translated into seats was another question. Also, (the government) seem to have accepted the result".

Mauricio Macri, president-elect of Argentina, had announced that he would request to remove Venezuela from Mercosur, as the government was not respecting democratic doctrines. He declined this plan when Maduro acknowledged the defeat of his party. However, a year after the election, on 1 December 2016, Venezuela was suspended from Mercosur.

Notes

References

Venezuela
Parliamentary elections
Crisis in Venezuela
Elections in Venezuela
December 2015 events in South America
Election and referendum articles with incomplete results